The 1899 college football season had no clear-cut champion, with the Official NCAA Division I Football Records Book listing Harvard and Princeton as having been selected national champions.

Chicago, Kansas, and Sewanee went undefeated. With just 13 players, the Sewanee team, known as the "Iron Men", had a six-day road trip with five shutout wins over Texas A&M; Texas; Tulane; LSU; and Ole Miss. Sportswriter Grantland Rice called the group "the most durable football team I ever saw."

Conference and program changes

Conference establishments
One conference played its final season in 1899:
Maryland Intercollegiate Football Association – active since 1894

Membership changes

Conference standings

Major conference standings

Independents

Minor conferences

See also
 1899 College Football All-America Team

References